Pseudacysta is a genus of lace bugs in the family Tingidae. There is one described species in Pseudacysta, P. perseae, which is a pest of avocado trees.

References

Further reading

 
 
 
 

Tingidae
Articles created by Qbugbot